Rösti or rööschti is a Swiss dish consisting mainly of potatoes, sautéed or shallow-fried in a pan. It was originally a breakfast dish, commonly eaten by farmers in the canton of Bern, but is now eaten all over Switzerland and around the world. The French name röstis bernois directly refers to the dish's origins. 

Many Swiss people consider rösti to be a national dish. Rather than considering it a complete breakfast, lunch or dinner, it is more commonly served to accompany other dishes such as Spinat und Spiegelei (spinach and fried eggs, sunny side up), cervelas or Fleischkäse. It is commonly available in Swiss restaurants as a replacement for the standard side dish of a given meal.

Preparation
Rösti dishes are made with coarsely grated potato, either parboiled or raw. Rösti are most often pan-fried and shaped in the frying pan during cooking, but they can also be baked in the oven. Depending on the frying technique, oil, butter, cheese, or another fat may be added (and usually salt and pepper).

Although basic rösti consists of nothing but potato, a number of additional ingredients are sometimes added, such as bacon, onion, cheese, apple or fresh herbs. This is usually considered to be a regional touch.

In Palau, instead of potato, rösti is prepared from the grated corm of taro.

Cultural impact
In Swiss popular cultural ethos, rösti are predominantly eaten in German-speaking regions, although they can be found easily elsewhere in the country. Rösti dishes are portrayed as a stereotypical part of the Swiss-Germanic culture, as opposed to Latin culture. The geographic border separating the French- and German-speaking parts of the country is therefore commonly referred to as the Röstigraben: literally the "rösti ditch".

Classic rösti dishes

See also
 Hash browns, a similar American dish
 Maluns, another Swiss fried potato dish essentially eaten in the Grisons
 List of potato dishes
 Liechtensteiner cuisine

References

External links

 Wikibooks / Cookbook recipe
 Rösti on helvetickitchen.com
 How to cook the perfect rösti on theguardian.com
 Rösti recipe on youtube
 Palauan recipe: Taro rösti (fried taro patties)

 Breakfast dishes
 Culinary Heritage of Switzerland
 Culture of Bern
 Fried foods
Liechtenstein cuisine
National dishes
Palauan cuisine
 Potato pancakes
 Swiss cuisine
Vegetarian cuisine